The 1989–90 South Florida Bulls men's basketball team represented the University of South Florida Bulls in the 1989–90 NCAA Division I men's basketball season. This was the 19th season in school history. The team was coached by Bobby Paschal in his fourth year at the school, and USF played its home games in the USF Sun Dome. The Bulls finished the season 20–11, 9–5 in Sun Belt play, and won the Sun Belt tournament to receive an automatic bid to the NCAA tournament – the first in school history. USF lost to Arizona in the first round.

Roster

Schedule and results

|-
!colspan=9| Regular season

|-
!colspan=9| Sun Belt tournament

|-
!colspan=9| NCAA tournament

References

South Florida Bulls men's basketball seasons
South Florida Bulls
South Florida
South Florida Bulls men's basketball team
South Florida Bulls men's basketball team